Liard River Hot Springs Provincial Park is a provincial park in British Columbia, Canada. It is home to the second largest natural hot springs in Canada, after Deer River Hot Springs 15 km to the north east. It is a natural river of hot water rather than a spring fed man made pool. The park is part of the larger Muskwa-Kechika Management Area.  The community of Liard River, British Columbia is located nearby.

History and conservation

The Liard River Hot Springs Provincial Park was created in April 1957. The first boardwalk and pool facilities were built by the United States Army in 1942. They were originally named the Theresa Hot Springs.

The park contains a warm water swamp and boreal forest which supports rich and diverse plant communities as well as mammal and bird species. Watch for moose feeding in the warm water swamps. Due to the lush plant life (including 14 species of orchids) influenced by the warmth of the springs, the area used to be known as the "Tropical Valley". A rare predatory black bear attack occurred on August 14, 1997, claiming two lives.

Recreation

There are raised walkways from the parking area to the springs so that the delicate muskeg that forms the swamp is not disturbed. The walkway was the scene of a much-publicized black bear attack that killed two tourists on August 14, 1997. 

The campground is open year-round

Amenities

Bathing pools
Change houses
Wheelchair access
Playground

Location
The park is located at mile 475 (or km 765) on the Alaska Highway, between Fort Nelson ( south-east) and Watson Lake ( north-west).  The community of Liard River is just west of the park, at the 499 Milepost.

Size
1082 hectares in size.

Photo gallery

See also
List of British Columbia Provincial Parks
List of Canadian provincial parks
List of National Parks of Canada
Muncho Lake Provincial Park
Stone Mountain Provincial Park
Toad River Hot Springs Provincial Park

References

External links

Liard River Hot Springs Provincial Park - on BC Parks (Ministry of Environment) website
 

Hot springs of British Columbia
Liard Country
Provincial parks of British Columbia
1957 establishments in British Columbia
Protected areas established in 1957